No-One is a 2018 Israeli-Ukrainian film written and directed by Vladimir Prudkin and Lev Prudkin. The film premiered at the 40th Moscow International Film Festival on April 23, 2018. The film won the awards for Best Feature Film and Best Cinematography at the Vienna Independent Film Festival, Best Feature Film at the Winchester Film Festival and other awards at international film festivals. It was presented at the Marché du Film of the 74th Festival de Cannes on July 10, 2021.

Synopsis 
Mysterious events happen in Crimea during the collapse of the Soviet Union.

NO-ONE is a family revenge story that turns into a parable of eternal return and historical guilt. It is an unusual anti-version of Shakespeare's Othello, where the Renaissance characters and events are depicted in a parallel reality in Russia during the military coup of 1991. Venice is replaced by Moscow, Cyprus – by Crimea; the Venetian general Othello becomes a general of the Russian secret police and the insidious schemer Iago, Othello's standard-bearer – an elite student, nephew of the Russian general. All this in a strange way corresponds to Shakespeare's oeuvre, but at some point the events and character relations as if instigated by irresistible forces of fate, start to move away from the familiar plot. The main character is a brilliantly educated and artistically gifted general serving a cruel and blood-drenched organization; he harbors no illusions about the world around him, constantly changes masks and roles, always remaining at the top. Nevertheless, karmic forces pull events and people around him into a deadly vortex of infidelities and defeats. Betrayals cling to one another, and the inevitable becomes reality.

Cast
Slava Jolobov (Vyacheslav Zholobov) - Oleg Sergeyevich, General of the KGB (Soviet Secret Service)
Natalia Vdovina - Tamara, his wife
George Marchenko - Vlad, his nephew, a student at a prestigious college 
Elizaveta Boyarskaya - Zina, Vlad's classmate, daughter of a Soviet party boss
Alexey Agranovich - Assistant to the General, KGB Officer
Dima (Dmytro) Sova - Sasha, lifeguard on the beach in the Crimea
Aleksandr Feklistov - KGB Officer, an old friend of the General
Lev Prudkin - KGB Officer in the Crimea
Edi Kvetner - Zhora, Vlad's classmate
Sophia Kashtanova - Miranda, Zina's friend

Awards
Best Feature Film and Best Cinematography Awards at Vienna Film Festival
Best Feature Film Award at Winchester International Film Festival
Best Director of Foreign Language Film Award at West Europe Film Festival in Brussels
Best Original Screenplay Award at London Fusion International Film Festival
Best Feature Film Finalist at Near Nazareth Film Festival in Israel
Best Feature Film Nominee at Burbank International Film Festival in Los Angeles
Best Drama Feature Award at Hong Kong Indie Film Festival
Best Feature Film Award at Seoul International Film Festival, Republic of Korea
Best Feature Film Award at Austin International Art Festival, USA
Best Feature Film Award at New Wave Film Festival in Munich, Germany

References

External links

2018 films
Russian-language Ukrainian films
Ukrainian thriller drama films
Israeli thriller drama films
2018 thriller drama films
Films set in 1991
Films set in Crimea
Films set in the Soviet Union
2018 drama films
2010s Russian-language films